Carl Marcus Joakim Hellner (born 25 November 1985) is a Swedish former cross-country skier who competed between 2003 and 2018. He retired at the end of the 2017-18 FIS World Cup season.

Athletic career

Hellner had a total of seven victories in the junior levels of cross-country skiing up to 30 km from 2003 to 2005. In Gällivare, Sweden, he took his first world cup win on a 15 km event.

Hellner won bronze, his first medal, in the 4 × 10 km relay at the 2007 FIS Nordic World Ski Championships in Sapporo.

In the 2010 Winter Olympics in Vancouver, Hellner won his first Olympic gold medal in the 30 km skiathlon, deciding the race in a sprint at the end. At the 4 × 10 km relay, Hellner took gold for Sweden after leading the race from the very start.

In the 2011 FIS Nordic World Ski Championships in Oslo, Hellner opened his championship with winning a victory in the men's sprint. A couple of days later, Hellner, like in the 2010 Winter Olympics, rode the last lap for Sweden in the 4 × 10 km relay. This time finishing second, winning a silver medal for Sweden.

In the 2012, Hellner became the first Swedish male skier to be on the podium in Tour de Ski by securing a second place overall after passing Petter Northug in the final uphill event.

At the 2014 Winter Olympics Hellner won a silver medal at the 30 km skiathlon and a gold in the men's 4 × 10 km relay, skiing the last leg.

On 6 May 2018, his retirement from cross–country skiing was announced.

Cross-country skiing results
All results are sourced from the International Ski Federation (FIS).

Olympic Games
 4 medals – (3 gold, 1 silver)

World Championships
 7 medals – (1 gold, 4 silver, 2 bronze)

World Cup

Season standings

Individual podiums
 5 victories – (2 , 3 ) 
 26 podiums – (10 , 16 )

Team podiums
 1 victory – (1 ) 
 10 podiums – (9 , 1 )

Personal life
Hellner participated in the 2010 World Series of Poker main event.
In March 2012, Hellner joined Team Pokerstars SportsStars alongside Mats Sundin and Boris Becker.

References

External links
 
 
 

1985 births
Living people
People from Skövde Municipality
Cross-country skiers from Västra Götaland County
Cross-country skiers at the 2010 Winter Olympics
Cross-country skiers at the 2014 Winter Olympics
Cross-country skiers at the 2018 Winter Olympics
Olympic cross-country skiers of Sweden
Olympic gold medalists for Sweden
Olympic silver medalists for Sweden
Olympic medalists in cross-country skiing
Swedish male cross-country skiers
FIS Nordic World Ski Championships medalists in cross-country skiing
Tour de Ski skiers
Medalists at the 2010 Winter Olympics
Medalists at the 2014 Winter Olympics
Gellivare Skidallians skiers
21st-century Swedish people